This is a list of notable non-governmental UFO organizations located around the world.

Belarus 
 UfoCom

Estonia 
 AKRAK (inactive)

Sweden 
 Archives for the Unexplained (AFU)

Russia 
 Kosmopoisk

United Kingdom 
 British UFO Research Association (BUFORA)

United States

Active 
 Center for the Study of Extraterrestrial Intelligence (CSETI)
 Center for UFO Studies (CUFOS or JAHCUFOS)
 International UFO Congress (IUFOC)
 Mutual UFO Network (MUFON)
 National UFO Reporting Center (NUFORC)
 To the Stars
 Unidentified Aerial Phenomenon Task Force (UAPTF)

Inactive / defunct 
 Advanced Aerospace Threat Identification Program (AATIP)
 Aerial Phenomena Research Organization (APRO)
 Citizens Against UFO Secrecy (CAUS)
 Civilian Saucer Intelligence (CSI)
 Fund for UFO Research (FUFOR)
 National Institute for Discovery Science (NIDSci)
 National Investigations Committee On Aerial Phenomena (NICAP)
 UFO Investigators League (UFOIL)

See also 
 List of investigations of UFOs by governments
 Identification studies of UFOs
 Ufology

Organizations

Lists of organizations